The 1980–81 UAB Blazers men's basketball team represented the University of Alabama at Birmingham as a member of the Sun Belt Conference during the 1980–81 NCAA Division I men's basketball season. This was head coach Gene Bartow's third season at UAB, and the Blazers played their home games at BJCC Coliseum. They finished the season 23–9, 9–3 in Sun Belt play and fell in the championship game of the Sun Belt tournament. They received an automatic bid to the NCAA tournament as No. 7 seed in the Mideast region. After beating No. 10 seed Western Kentucky in the opening round, UAB upset No. 2 seed Kentucky to reach the Sweet Sixteen. The Blazers fell to No. 3 seed and eventual National champion Indiana in the Mideast regional semifinal, 87–72.

This season marked Coach Bartow's first trip (of nine total) to the NCAA tournament as coach of the Blazers, and started a string of seven consecutive bids to the Big Dance.

Roster

Schedule and results

|-
!colspan=9 style=| Regular season

|-
!colspan=9 style=| Sun Belt tournament

|-
!colspan=9 style=| NCAA tournament

Rankings

Awards and honors
Gene Bartow – Sun Belt Conference Coach of the Year

References

UAB Blazers men's basketball seasons
UAB
UAB